The Alternative DJ was a radio programme that aired from July 1995 to August 1995.  There were 4 half-hour episodes and it was broadcast on BBC Radio 2.  It starred Peter Jeffrey, Judi Spiers, and Oliver Senton.

References 
 Lavalie, John. "The Alternative DJ." EpGuides. 21 Jul 2005. 29 Jul 2005  <http://epguides.com/AlternativeDJ/>.

BBC Radio 2 programmes